This is an alphabetical list of musicians from Pakistan. The list includes musical bands, some groups and solo artists that were and are in the industry today. The list also includes film singers, folk singers, pop/rock singers, jazz musicians, rap artists, dj, qawwal and ghazal traditional artists. Pakistani singers and bands became very popular and started to spring up during the early nineties, with pop, rock and Ghazal becoming more fashionable with the younger generations.

A
 A. Nayyar
 Ali Zafar
Aziz Mian
 Aamir Zaki
 Aaroh
Abdullah Qureshi
 Atish Raj
 Abrar-ul-Haq
 Abida Parveen
 Adil Omar
 Ahmed Ghulamali Chagla
 Ahmed Jahanzeb
 Ahmed Rushdi
 Alam Lohar
 Alamgir
 Ali Alam
 Ali Azmat
 Ali Baba Khan
 Ali Haider
 Allan Fakir
 Atif Aslam
 Alamgir
 Amjad Bobby
 Arham
 Annie Khalid
 Arieb Azhar
 Arif Lohar
 Arshad Mehmood
 Asad Amanat Ali Khan
 Asif Sinan, guitarist and composer
 Awaz
 Attaullah Khan Esakhelvi
 Asim Azhar
 Aima Baig

B
Badnaam (band)
Bayaan
Benjamin Sisters
 Bilal Maqsood (Strings)
 Bilal Khan
 Bohemia The Punjabi Rapper
 Brian O'Connell (Junoon)
 Bilal Saeed
 Badar Miandad

D

E
 Esta Livio
 Entity Paradigm

F
 Faisal Kapadia (Strings)
 Farhad Humayun
 Faakhir Mehmood
 Farhan Saeed
 Farrukh Fateh Ali Khan 
 Fariha Pervez
 Farooq Haider

G
 Ghulam Abbas (singer)
 Ghulam Farid Sabri (Qawwali Singer)
 Ghazala Javed
 Ghulam Ali
 Ghulam Haider
 Goher Mumtaz
 Gul Panra

H
 Habib Wali Mohammad
 Hadiqa Kiyani
 Haider Rahman (Laal)
 Hamid Ali Khan
 Haroon
 Haroon Shahid
 Hasan Jahangir
 Humera Arshad

I
 Imran Khan
 Inayat Hussain Bhatti
 Irene Perveen
 Irteassh
 Iqbal Bano

J
 Jawad Ahmad
 Jawad Bashir (Dr. aur Billa)
 Jay Dittamo (Junoon)
 Jal
 Jehangir Aziz Hayat
 Junaid Jamshaid
 Junaid Khan
 Junoon
 Jupiters
 Joag
 JoSH

K
 Karavan
Kashan Admani
 Karan Sharma
Kami Paul
 Kamal Ahmed
 Komal Rizvi

L
 Laila Khan (Singer)
 Laal
 Leo Twins

M
 Muhammad Hassaan
 Mala
 Malika Pukhraj
 Maqbool Ahmed Sabri
 Masood Rana
 Master Muhammad Ibrahim
 Mehdi Hassan
 Mehnaz Begum
 Momina Mustehsan
 Mohammad Aizaz Sohail
 Mumtaz Ahmed
 Mujeeb Alam
 Mustafa Zahid
 Mohammed Ali Shehki
 Munawar Sultana (singer)
 Munni Begum
 Muazam Soomro

N
 Nabeel Shaukat Ali
 Nadia Ali
 Naheed Akhtar
 Najam Sheraz
 Naseebo Lal
 Naseem Begum
 Naseer & Shahab
 Naser Mestarihi
Natasha Khan
 Niaz Ahmed
 Nazia Hassan
 Nazia Iqbal
 Nisar Bazmi
 Nizar Lalani
 Noori
 Noor Jehan
 Nouman Javaid
 Nusrat Fateh Ali Khan
 Nusrat Hussain
 Nayyara Noor

O
 Overload

P
 Pathanay Khan

Q
 Qurat-ul-Ain Balouch
 Qayaas

R
 Rabi Pirzada
 Rahim Shah
 Rahat Fateh Ali Khan
 Reshma
 Rohail Hyatt
 Roxen
 Rajab Ali (singer)
 Rangeela

S
 Sabri Brothers
 Sajjad Ali
 Sajid Ghafoor (Sajid & Zeeshan)
 Salma Agha
 Saleem Raza
 Salman Ahmad
 Sanam Marvi
 Sara Haider
 Sara Raza Khan
 Shafqat Amanat Ali
 Shahid Akhtar Qalandar
 Shahram Azhar (Laal (band))
 Shahnaz Begum (Sohni Dharti Allah Rakhe fame)
 Shehzad Roy
 Shallum Asher Xavier (Fuzön (band))
 Sain Zahoor
 Saturn (band)
 Shiraz Uppal
 Salman Ali
 Sahir Ali Bagga
 Shani Arshad
 Shuja Haider
 Shamim Nazli
 Sohail Rana
 Suraiya Multanikar
 Syed Zaheer Rizvi

T
 Tahira Syed
 The Band Call
 Taimur Rahman (Laal)
 Tassawar Khanum

U
 Ustad Amanat Ali Khan
 Ustad Muhammad Juman
 Ustad Muhammad Yousuf
 Ustad Nusrat Fateh Ali Khan
 Umair Jaswal
 Uzair Jaswal

V
 Vital Signs

W
 Wajid Ali Nashad
 Waqar Ali
 Waris Baig

Y
 Yasir Jaswal
 Yatagan (Fakhre Alam)

Z
 Zeeshan Parwez (Sajid & Zeeshan)
 Zeek Afridi
 Zohaib Hassan
 Zoe Viccaji
 Zeb & Haniya
 Zulfiqar Jabbar Khan
 Zayn Javadd Malik
 Zubaida Khanum

See also 
 Music of Pakistan
 List of Pakistani ghazal singers
 List of Pakistani qawwali singers
 List of Pakistani pop singers
 List of Pakistani musical groups
 List of songs about Pakistan
 List of musicians
 List of Pakistanis

References

 
 List
 
Pakistani